The Whitefish River is a river in Kenora District in northwestern Ontario, Canada. It is in the Hudson Bay and Nelson River drainage basins and is a tributary of the Berens River.

Course
The river begins at an unnamed lake and flows south to Retter Lake. It heads west, takes in the left tributary outflow from an unnamed creek from Blondin Lake, and turns north to take in the right tributary outflow from an unnamed creek from Turp Lake. The river then heads northwest, takes in left tributary unnamed creek outflow from Coathup Lake and reaches its mouth at the Berens River, which empties into Lake Winnipeg.

See also
List of rivers of Ontario

References

Rivers of Kenora District
Tributaries of Hudson Bay